Joseph Spencer (October 3, 1714 – January 13, 1789) was an American lawyer, soldier, and statesman from Connecticut.  During the Revolutionary War, he served both as a delegate to the Continental Congress and as a major general in the Continental Army.

Early life
Spencer was born in East Haddam, Connecticut.  Spencer was the son of Isaac and Mary (née Selden) Spencer.  He was the great-grandson of Gerard and Hannah Spencer, who were part of the first settlers of East Haddam in 1662.

Career
He was trained as a lawyer and practiced until 1753, when he became a judge. He was active in the militia, serving in King George's War and as a Lieutenant Colonel of the Middlesex militia in the French and Indian War.

By the time the American Revolution began, Spencer had advanced to Brigadier General of Connecticut’s militia, and in April 1775 he led them to support the Siege of Boston as the 2nd Connecticut Regiment. In June, when these units were adopted into the national army, he was made a brigadier general in the Continental Army; he was amongst the first eight Continental Army brigadier generals so appointed.

In 1776, Spencer was promoted to major general in support of William Heath in the Eastern Department. The following year his military career became difficult. He cancelled a planned attack on British forces in Rhode Island and was censured by the Continental Congress.  He demanded a court of inquiry and was exonerated, but when the controversy was resolved, he resigned his commission on June 14, 1778.

Spencer first served on the Connecticut Council (or Connecticut State Senate) in 1776.  Free of military responsibility, the state sent him as a delegate to the Continental Congress in 1779. In 1780, he was returned to the council, and served there until his death. After the Revolutionary War he became eligible for membership in the Society of the Cincinnati of the State of Connecticut.

Personal life

August 2, 1738, Joseph Spencer married Martha Brainerd (1716–1754), with whom he had five children.

 Martha Spencer (1739–1739/40), who died young.
 Martha Spencer, who married Joseph Cone, Jr. (born 1735).
 Anne Spencer (born 1746).
 Joseph Spencer, Jr. (1750–1824), who became a surgeon and served as an aid to his father during the Revolution.
 Nehemiah Spencer (born 1752)

After his first wife's death in 1754, he married Hannah (née Brown) Southmaid (1730–1808), with whom he had eight more children, including:

 Isaac Spencer (born 1759), who served as Connecticut State Treasurer from 1818 to 1835.
 Jared Spencer (1762–1820), a twin who was a Yale graduate and an attorney who married Ann Green (1768–1855) in 1789.
 Mary Spencer (born 1762), a twin who married Turner Miner.
 Seth Spencer (born 1765)
 Hannah Spencer (1767–1843), who married Rev. Ichabod Lord Skinner (1767–1852)
 Betty Spencer (born 1770), who married Selden Warner.
 Nehemiah Spencer (1772–1839), who married Betsey Swan (died 1853)

Spencer died on January 13, 1789, in East Haddam and was buried in Millington Cemetery west of the Millington Green section of East Haddam near where he lived.  Later he and his wife were re-interred at the Nathan Hale Park of East Haddam and a monument was erected in his honor.

Descendants

His granddaughter through his son Joseph, Elizabeth Spencer, was married to General Lewis Cass (1782–1866), who also served as governor of the Michigan Territory, a United States senator from the state of Michigan, and as secretary of state under President James Buchanan.

Major General Robert Ernest Noble was Spencer's great-great-great-grandson and became a member of the Society of the Cincinnati.

References
Notes

Sources

  - bibliography of Spencer's Regiment in the Revolutionary Army

External links

 
 
The Society of the Cincinnati
The American Revolution Institute

1714 births
1789 deaths
Continental Army generals
American people of English descent
Continental Army officers from Connecticut
Continental Congressmen from Connecticut
18th-century American politicians
Members of the Connecticut General Assembly Council of Assistants (1662–1818)
People of Connecticut in the American Revolution
People of Connecticut in the French and Indian War
Military personnel from Connecticut